Joram Rozov (born 1938) is an Israeli artist. He was a professor of art at Bezalel Academy of Arts and Design.

Biography
Joram Rozov was born in Hadera, Israel. In 1958-1962, he studied at the Bezalel Academy of Art and Design in Jerusalem. In 1962-1966, he studied at the Academy of Art in Florence, Italy. After returning to Israel, he taught art and music at Hadera High School. In 
1970, taught at the Youth Wing of the Israel Museum. In 1965-1974, he served as Dean of Students at Bezalel. In 1971-1973, he taught at Cape College in Cape Town, South Africa.

Artistic style
Many of Rosov's realist paintings document his immediate surroundings. He paints landscapes of the Galilee, Hebron, Africa and Tuscany, as well as views of foliage, trees and sabra bushes. Pilots and soldiers are a dominant theme in his early work. Rozov creates an atmosphere of portending destruction, with violence present in an indirect manner. His painting is typified by attention to minute detail, combining local and European painterly traditions.

Awards and recognition
1967 UNESCO and Prince Rainier Prize at Biennale for Plastic Arts, Monaco
1973 Israel Council for Culture and Art, stipend for advanced studies
 2002 Mordechai Ish-Shalom Prize for Life's Work

Published works
Landscapes and Milestones

See also
Visual arts in Israel

References

Israeli painters
Realist painters
1938 births
Living people